Timothy Scannell (12 November 1882 – 9 July 1939) was an Australian cricketer. He played two first-class cricket matches for Victoria in 1910.

See also
 List of Victoria first-class cricketers

References

External links
 

1882 births
1939 deaths
Australian cricketers
Victoria cricketers
Cricketers from Melbourne